is the world's first theme park based on Thomas & Friends. The park opened in 1998 and is located at the Fuji-Q Highland, an amusement park in Fujiyoshida, Yamanashi, Japan.

Attractions include "The Great Gatagoto Adventure" (a story-driven narrated indoor rail ride), a Thomas Land 3D Theater, "Thomas & Percy's Fun Ride" (an outdoor rail ride), "GO! GO! Bulstrode" (a water raft rail ride), self-drive vehicles, Mischievous Cranky (a rotating aerial ride), Rock n' Roll Duncan (a rail ride for small children), a Thomas-themed hedge maze, and monuments to Thomas and Percy for photo opportunities.

Thomas Land is different from the smaller Thomas Town attractions in Japan, one in Shinmisato, and the other in Kurashiki.

Attractions
 Rock-n-Roll Duncan - Based on the episode "Rock N Roll"
 Thomas and Percy Fun Ride
 The Exciting Cruise- Based on the episode "Sir Topham Hatt's Holiday"
 Mischievous Cranky
 Everybody Twist Tea-Cups Ride
 Bulstrode Roller Ride
 Thomas Land 3D Theater - Refurbish to Thomas' Dokidoki Playground in 2018
 Thomas' Party Parade - Refurbish to Thomas' Treasure Hunt in 2019
 Happy Harold - 1998 to 2018
 Thomas Monument
 Thomas Maze - 1998 to 2015.
 Percy Monument
 Gazebo
 Story Creation Station
 Play Area - 1998 to 2010
 Wishing Falls - Based on the episode "Toby and the Flood"
 Thomas' Happy Smile
 Hopping Winston
 3D Circus 
 Jack's Digging Adventure  - Based on the Feature-length special. Limited theatrical release. "Digs and Discovers"
 Jack and his friends to digging the mine and put the mud down into the mine.

See also

 Thomas Land (Drayton Manor) - a Thomas & Friends theme park at the Drayton Manor theme park in the United Kingdom.

External links
 Official website (English)
 Sodor-island.net English language guide and interactive map of both Thomas Land theme parks at Fuji-Q Highland and Drayton Manor
 Thomas Town

Fuji Q
 
Amusement parks in Japan
Tourist attractions in Yamanashi Prefecture